On 24 February 2022,  in a major escalation of the Russo-Ukrainian War, which began in 2014.

The UK's Royal United Services Institute for Defence and Security Studies has identified the importance of the dispersal of Ukraine's forces, the firepower of Ukraine, and the stockpiles of materiel available to Ukraine in the face of the invasion. The findings of the Royal United Services Institute report are
 The Russian military is largely subordinated to the special services of Russia (the  FSB, GUSP, SVR, FSO, and the GRU— but see Siloviki.)
 The Russian force-generation model neglects the non-commissioned officers
 There is a culture of reinforcing failed orders unless those orders are directly changed at higher levels
 The Russian system incentivises a dishonest reporting culture
 The Russian processes for identifying friend from foe are inadequate, leading to fratricide. This forces capabilities that should reinforce each other to operate sequentially, instead.

"The Institute for the Study of War (ISW) has said that Russia has not shown the capacity to sustain multiple major offensive operations at once".

Foreign military sales and aid 

Although Ukraine is not a member of NATO and does not have any military alliance with the United States or with any NATO nation, the Kiel Institute has tracked $84.2 billion from the 40 countries and the European Union in financial, humanitarian, and military aid to Ukraine from 24 January to 3 August 2022. NATO is coordinating and assisting member states in providing billions of dollars in military equipment and financial aid to Ukraine. The United States has provided the most military assistance, having provided $29.3 billion (February 2022-3 February 2023). Many NATO members and allies, such as Germany and Sweden, have reversed past policies against providing offensive military aid in order to support Ukraine. The European Union for the first time in its history supplied lethal arms and has provided €3.1 billion to Ukraine. Bulgaria, a major manufacturer of Soviet-pattern weapons, has covertly supplied more than €2 billion worth of arms and ammunition to Ukraine, including a third of the ammunition needed by the Ukrainian military in the critical early phase of the invasion; Bulgaria also provides fuel supplies and has, at times, covered 40% of the fuel needs of the Ukrainian armed forces.

Between 2014 and 2021, the UK, US, EU, and NATO provided mostly non-lethal military aid to Ukraine. Lethal military support was initially limited. The US began to sell weapons including Javelin anti-tank missiles starting in 2018, and Ukraine agreed to purchase TB2 combat drones from Turkey in 2019. Russia built up equipment and troops on Ukraine's borders in January 2022. In response, the US worked with other NATO member states to transfer US-produced weapons to Ukraine. The UK also began to supply Ukraine with NLAW and Javelin anti-tank weapons. After the invasion, NATO member states including Germany agreed to supply weapons, but NATO as an organisation did not. NATO and its members also refused to send troops into Ukraine, or to establish a no fly-zone, lest this spark a larger-scale war, a decision some labelled appeasement.

Aid via drawdown from existing stocks
On 26 February 2022, US Secretary of State Antony Blinken announced $350 million in lethal military assistance, including anti-armor and anti-aircraft systems. The next day the EU stated that it would purchase €450 million (US$502 million) in lethal assistance and an additional €50 million ($56 million) in non-lethal supplies for Ukraine, with Poland handling distribution. During the first week of the invasion, NATO member states supplied more than 17,000 anti-tank weapons to Ukraine; by mid-March, the number was estimated to be more than 20,000. In three tranches agreed in February, March and April 2022, the European Union committed to €1.5 billion to support the capabilities and resilience of the Ukrainian Armed Forces and the protection of the Ukrainian civilian population, under the purview of the European Peace Facility line.

As of 11 April 2022, Ukraine had been provided with approximately 25,000 anti-air and 60,000 anti-tank weapon systems by the US and its allies. The following day, Russia reportedly received anti-tank missiles and RPGs from Iran, supplied through undercover networks via Iraq. On 19 April 2022, Romania announced a planned reform to the government decree that regulates the export of military weapons and national defence products to provide these weapons not only to NATO allies but also to Ukraine. The Ministry of Defense developed the draft decree stating that the reason behind this decision was Russia's aggression against Ukraine. However, on 27 April Defense Minister Vasile Dincu said that his plan had been discontinued. On 26 April 2022, the US convened a conference in which representatives of more than 40 countries met at the Ramstein Air Base to discuss military support for Ukraine. On 28 April 2022, US President Biden asked Congress for an additional $33 billion to assist Ukraine, including $20 billion to provide weapons to Ukraine. On 5 May, Ukraine's Prime Minister Denys Shmyhal announced that Ukraine had received more than $12 billion worth of weapons and financial aid from Western countries since the start of Russia's invasion on 24 February. On 10 May, the House passed legislation that would provide $40 billion in new aid to Ukraine. After the legislation was approved by the Senate, Biden signed the legislation on 21 May.

On 30 May 2022, French Foreign Minister Catherine Colonna announced the provision to Ukraine of additional CAESAR self-propelled howitzer systems, mounted on the Renault Sherpa 5 6×6 chassis. On 25 May, the Commander-in-Chief of the Armed Forces of Ukraine Valerii Zaluzhnyi said that the first batch was already on the front lines fighting the invader. On 10 June, the AFU demonstrated the combat systems to representatives from the press; by that date the Ukrainian gunners possessed 18 CAESAR units. On 31 May 2022, the White House informed the press that the US would be supplying HIMARS multiple launch rocket systems to Ukraine. Some analysts had said HIMARS could be a "game-changer" in the war. Under Secretary of Defense for Policy Colin Kahl stated that the US would be able to send more systems as the fighting evolves.

On 10 June 2022, an official from the Ukrainian military said that they were using 5,000 to 6,000 artillery rounds a day and would then be using 155-calibre NATO standard shells because all their Soviet-era guns had been destroyed. The official said the Russians had transformed the war into an artillery duel focused on the southeast of the country. On 12 June, a Ukrainian Presidential advisor put on Twitter a list of weapons that Ukraine needed to achieve "heavy weapons parity". The top item was "1000 howitzers caliber 155 mm". Ukraine claimed it had enough 155mm ammunition but lacked the artillery to use it. According to Oryxspioenkop only 250 howitzers have been promised or delivered. On 13 June, a Deutsche Welle correspondent said that the Ukrainian supply of Soviet-era ammunition had been exhausted and all they had was a dwindling supply obtained from friendly ex-Soviet countries. In June 2022 Germany declassified its list of military aid to Ukraine. As of July 2022, CNN reported on American recent declassified intel suggested that Iranians have given Shahed 129 UAV combat drones to Russian forces.

For the 16 US-supplied HIMARS systems in Ukraine (2 August 2022), the US was providing more munitions (additional HIMARS rocket pods in monthly installments, as well as more 155-mm howitzer shells) at a cost of $550 million for the 17th Presidential drawdown package. The 18th US presidential drawdown package was released (8 Aug 2022), a $1 billion package including additional HIMARS rocket pods, 75,000 rounds of 155mm artillery ammunition, 20 120mm mortar systems and 20,000 rounds of 120mm mortar ammunition, National Advanced Surface-to-Air Missile Systems (NASAMS), 1000 Javelins and hundreds of AT4 anti-tank weapons, 50 armored medical treatment vehicles, Claymore mines, C4 explosives, and medical supplies. The 19th US presidential drawdown package (19 Aug 2022) was a $775 million package, which included additional HIMARS rocket pods, 16 105mm howitzers with 36,000 artillery rounds (this supplements the UK's past contributions of 105mm howitzers), 1000 anti-armor Javelins, 2000 anti-armor rounds for the Swedish Carl Gustaf 8.4 cm recoilless rifle, 1,500 tube-launched, optically tracked, wire-guided anti-tank missiles (BGM-71 TOWs), additional AGM-88 HARM air-launched anti-radiation missiles that home on radar sites, 15 ScanEagle UAVs (to guide Ukrainian artillery), 40 mine flail vehicles to clear out minefields, 50 HMMWVs, tactical secure communication systems, demolition munitions, night vision devices, thermal imagery systems, optics, and laser rangefinders.
The packages since 2021 totaled $10.7 billion by 19 August 2022.

In September 2022, 800 combat drones manufactured by the Taiwanese DronesVision were transferred to Ukraine through Poland. In November 2022, United Kingdom announced they were donating three former Royal Navy and Royal Air Force Sea King's to Ukraine.

The Institute for the Study of War has assessed that the need for Western supplies was apparent in June 2022, and that, if commitments had been made and preparations for delivery had been made at that time, Ukraine would have been ready to deploy the materiel in November or December 2022. Western nations committed to the delivery of tanks in January 2023. Ukraine was unable to take advantage of Russian military depletion and disorganisation following the successful Kharkiv and Kherson counter-offensives in late 2022, due in significant part to the need to conserve limited stocks of Soviet equipment and the absence of an expectation of Western replacements. This delay allowed Russia to reorganise and reinforce its armed forces, potentially prolonging the war.

Ukraine security assistance package

On 24 August 2022, US President Biden announced aid for longer-term requirements by Ukraine to the amount of $3 billion, the largest aid package since the beginning of the Russian invasion. The money was released from a congressional funding source (Ukraine Security Assistance Initiative — USAI) to allow the US government to procure weapons from industry, including NASAMS air defense units, Puma drones and Vampire counter-drone missiles. The Vampire contract was not yet let as of November 2022, with delivery to Ukraine after mid-2023. The longer-term deliveries of materiel will include six additional NASAMS air defense units and their attendant rounds (for a total of eight units); up to 245,000 155mm howitzer shells; up to 65,000 120mm mortar rounds; up to 24 counter-battery radars, and the attendant training, maintenance, and sustainment. By 24 August 2022 US aid since January 2021 exceeded $13.5 billion. By August 2022, the United Kingdom had provided military aid to the value of £2.3bn ($2.8bn). This included three M270 Multiple Launch Rocket Systems, some 5,000 NLAW anti-tank missiles, "hundreds" of Brimstone missiles, 120 armoured vehicles including Mastiff Protected Patrol Vehicles, and heavy-lift drones. Additionally, 10,000 Ukrainian soldiers were in an intensive 120-day infantry training course at four bases in Britain, delivered by a multi-national team of trainers.

On 8 September 2022, US secretary of state Blinken announced $2 billion in aid to Ukraine and eighteen partners in the defence industrial base. In addition US secretary of defense Austin announced the 20th drawdown package —up to $675 million for Ukraine military aid at the Ukraine Defense Contact Group meeting in Germany, as well as discussion of initiatives for the respective industrial bases of the Defense Contact Group, in order to defend Ukraine's sovereign territory for the long haul. On 28 September William LaPlante, US under-secretary of defense for acquisition and sustainment (USD (A&S)) met in Brussels with 40 counterparts in the Ukraine Defense Contact Group. On the agenda was the identification of industrial suppliers of replacement materiel such as gun barrels, ball bearings, steel casings, and microchips, without which the existing military aid will eventually cease to function due to heavy use on the battlefield. LaPlante later noted that a policy of "interoperability, but interchangeability, with multiple plants in multiple countries making identical items" will have a deterrent effect on the adversaries of those countries, as well as on the adversaries of Ukraine. Arms suppliers from Eastern Europe were also arming Ukraine using Ukraine Defense Contacts. On 15 September 2022, US President Biden announced his 21st drawdown package, worth $600 million in military aid to Ukraine in light of the 2022 Ukrainian Kharkiv counteroffensive. On 28 September 2022, the US department of defense announced a USAI (Ukraine Security Assistance Initiative) package worth up to $1.1 billion, which will purchase 18 additional HIMARS systems and their associated rockets from vendors in the future. By 28 September 16 HIMARS systems drawn from the US and an additional 10 equivalent systems from the allies were in service in Ukraine. This USAI package was also to include 150 Humvees (HMMWVs), 150 tactical vehicles, 20 multi-mission radars, explosive ordnance disposal equipment, body armor and tactical secure communications systems, surveillance systems and optics. Training for Ukrainian troops, maintenance, and sustainment were included in this long-term package, totaling $16.2 billion in aid since the beginning of the 2022 invasion.

Proposal for a Kyiv Security Compact

In September 2022, former NATO Secretary General Anders Fogh Rasmussen delivered a proposal for a long lasting Kyiv Security Compact to President Volodymyr Zelenskyy, on legally binding security guarantees for Ukraine from a coalition of Western countries to bolster its ability to fend off Russian attacks through extensive joint training, the provision of advanced defense weapons systems, and support to develop the country's own defense industrial base.

Lend-Lease for Ukraine

On 1 October 2022 Lend-Lease for Ukraine came into effect. A proposal to administer US security assistance as part of EUCOM is under consideration at the Pentagon. This plan would systematise the services currently being provided to Ukraine on an ad hoc basis, and would provide a long-term vehicle for countering Russian plans under the provisions of the Lend-Lease act, and for coordinating Allied aid for Ukraine's defense with Ukrainian requests at a single point of contact in Wiesbaden, Germany.

On 4 October 2022 the 22nd Presidential drawdown from US stocks to Ukraine, $625 million in security assistance, included a tailored package: 4 more HIMARS systems and their associated rockets; 16 more M777 155mm howitzers and 75,000 155mm rounds; 500 M982 Excalibur precision-guided 155mm rounds; 1,000 155mm rounds of remote anti-armor mine systems; 16 more 105mm M119 howitzers; 30,000 120 mm mortar rounds; 200 mine-resistant, ambush-protected vehicles (MRAPs); 200,000 rounds of small arms ammunition; and Claymore mines. The package responds to current Ukrainian ammunition consumption rates during their latest offensives; more aid is forthcoming according to Laura Cooper, a US DoD deputy assistant secretary of defense. So far, the security assistance has totalled $16.8 billion to Ukraine.

On 14 October 2022 the 23rd Presidential drawdown from US stocks provided Ukraine $725 million in security assistance, including additional rounds for High Mobility Artillery Rocket Systems (HIMARS); 23,000 155mm howitzer rounds; 500 precision-guided 155mm artillery rounds; 5,000 155mm rounds of Remote Anti-Armor Mine (RAAM) Systems; 5,000 anti-tank weapons; High-speed Anti-radiation missiles (HARMs); more than 200 High Mobility Multipurpose Wheeled Vehicles (HMMWVs); small arms and more than 2,000,000 rounds of small arms ammunition; and medical supplies. So far, the security assistance has totalled $18.2 billion to Ukraine since January 2021.

On 17 October 2022 the European Union approved €500 million ($486 million) in weapons for Ukraine, and a two-year training mission under the command of Vice Admiral Hervé Bléjean (France) for 15,000 Ukrainian troops, initially. The training, at the "individual, collective and specialized" levels would be held in Germany and Poland, and would be open to other nations as well. The planned training cost would be nearly €107 million. The EU is doubling the training commitment to 30,000 troops. See § Training in combined arms operations.

Aid in construction of a missile defence system

Missile defence of Ukraine was arriving piecemeal; in Brussels on 12 October 2022, US Army General Mark Milley suggested to the Ukraine Defense Contact Group that the allies of Ukraine "chip in to help Ukraine rebuild and sustain an integrated air and missile defense system" from the contributed air and missile defence system materiel. Specifically, Ukraine would need to link together and integrate their existing materiel and radars with "command and control and communication systems". See §Ukraine's air and missile defence

On 12 October 2022 German Defence Minister Christine Lambrecht announced that an IRIS-T air defence system had arrived in Ukraine, with three more forthcoming in 2023.
On 28 October 2022 the Pentagon announced the 24th Presidential drawdown of materiel worth $275 million; the security assistance has totalled $18.5 billion to Ukraine since January 2021. The aid included 500 Excalibur precision-guided 155mm artillery rounds, 2000 155mm remote anti-armor mine systems, more than 1,300 anti-armor weapons, more than 2.75 million rounds of small arms ammunition, more HIMARS rockets, 125 Humvees, and four satellite communications antennas for Ukraine's command and control systems, as well as training for operation of the NASAMS units. Two NASAMS units arrived in Ukraine on 7 November 2022.

Security Assistance Group Ukraine (SAGU)

By 21 July 2022, the EUCOM Control Center-Ukraine/International Donor Coordination Centre (ECCU/IDCC) a joint cell formed in March 2022 had trained 1,500 Ukrainian Armed Forces members on coalition-donated equipment. By 4 November 2022, the equipment shipments, and training measures of the Ukraine Contact Group had become repeatable enough to systematise in a Security Assistance Group Ukraine (SAGU), based in Wiesbaden, Germany.

On 4 November 2022 the Pentagon announced a $400 million USAI security assistance package to refurbish 45 T-72 tanks from the Czech Republic with "advanced optics, communications and armor packages"; in addition 1,100 Phoenix Ghost tactical unmanned aerial systems (UASs), and "40 armored riverine boats" were in the package. The combined additional aid amounted to 90 more T-72s by year-end 2022, plus 250 M1117 Armored Security Vehicles furnished for the first time, as well as the refurbished HAWK missiles from the Czech Republic, which will serve on the HAWK launchers from Spain. On 10 November, the $400 million aid announcement was clarified: 4 Stinger-based air defense AN/TWQ-1 Avengers, to counter the Iranian drones, were provided to Ukraine for the first time, as well as additional HIMARS rockets, 10,000 mortar rounds, thousands of 155mm howitzer rounds, 400 grenade launchers, 100 Humvees, 20 million rounds of small arms ammunition, and cold-weather gear. So far, the 20 HIMARS launchers drawn from US stocks are still in service; hundreds of T-72s have already been provided by Poland and other nations; the USAI security assistance has totalled $18.9 billion to Ukraine since January 2021.

On 15 November 2022 the US White House Office of Management and Budget asked Congress for an additional $38 billion in fiscal year 2023 in aid for Ukraine. The supplemental funding request included $21.7 billion in security assistance, $14.5 billion in US State department sources and USAID sources to be provided to Ukraine's government, humanitarian relief, and global food security, as well as a $900 million request for the Department of Health and Human Services, to "provide standard assistance health care and support services to Ukrainian parolees"; in addition a $626 million Energy Department request would aid nuclear security at the power plant in Zaporizhzhia. In addition the US White House is requesting that Congress grant $7 billion in additional presidential drawdown authority from existing Defense department materiel. Were Congress to grant this fourth request, the total aid to Ukraine would be $104 billion in less than a year.

On 17 November 2022, it was reported that Israel approved the transfer of weapons systems with Israeli parts, via NATO countries including the UK. These include advanced fire-control and electro-optic systems. It also agreed to buy strategic materials for the Ukrainian armed forces.

On 23 November 2022 the Pentagon announced its 26th drawdown package of up to $400 million in aid. The aid consisted of more HIMARS rockets, more high-speed anti-radiation missiles (AGM-88 HARMs), 200 precision-guided 155mm artillery M982 Excalibur rounds, 150 heavy machine guns to shoot down drones, additional NASAMS missiles for air defense, 150 Humvees, over 100 additional light tactical vehicles, over 200 electrical generators, 20 million rounds of small arms ammunition, and spare parts for 105mm howitzers.

On 9 December 2022 the Pentagon announced the US president had authorized the 27th drawdown package of up to $275 million in aid to Ukraine for additional HIMARS rockets, 80,000 155mm artillery rounds, counter-unmanned aerial systems (counter-UASs), counter air defense equipment, HMMWVs (Humvees) Ambulances and medical equipment, nearly 150 generators, and field equipment.

On 21 December 2022 Antony Blinken of the US State department announced the 28th drawdown of aid for Ukraine, a $1 billion package consisting of a Patriot missile battery; in addition the Pentagon announced $850 million of security assistance for Ukraine under its Ukraine Security Assistance Initiative. Training in the use of these Patriot missiles will be required for Ukraine's troops. The materiel also included JDAM kits for Precision aerial munitions. Additional aid from the drawdown included: additional ammunition for HIMARS High Mobility Artillery Rocket Systems;
500 precision-guided 155mm artillery rounds; 
10 120mm mortar systems and 10,000 120mm mortar rounds; 
10 82mm mortar systems; 
10 60mm mortar systems; 
37 Cougar Mine Resistant Ambush Protected vehicles (MRAPs); 
120 High Mobility Multipurpose Wheeled Vehicles (Humvees); 
Six armored utility trucks; 
High-speed anti-radiation missiles; 
2,700 grenade launchers and small arms; 
Claymore anti-personnel munitions; 
Demolition munitions and equipment; 
Night vision devices and optics; 
Tactical secure communications systems; and 
Body armor and other field equipment. The USAI (from industry rather than from United States Department of Defense stocks) will be: 45,000 152mm artillery rounds;
20,000 122mm artillery rounds; 
50,000 122mm GRAD rockets; 
100,000 rounds of 125mm tank ammunition; and
Satellite communications terminals and services; 
Funding for training, maintenance and sustainment.

On 6 January 2023 Chancellor Scholz, and President Biden announced the contribution of Marder, and Bradley armoured fighting vehicles from Germany, and the US respectively; President Macron had announced France's contribution of AMX-10 RC armoured fighting vehicles two days earlier. About 50 Bradley Fighting Vehicles were in the US drawdown package; several dozen AMX-10s were available from France. The 29th US drawdown amounted to $2.85 billion in aid; in addition the US aid package provided $200 million in foreign military financing for Ukraine. The Bradley package included 50 MRAPs, 138 Humvees, 500 TOW missiles, and 250,000 rounds of 25mm ammunition. The US also announced the contribution of 18 Paladin self-propelled 155mm howitzers for the first time as well as 100 additional M113 armored personnel carriers and 70,000 additional 155mm howitzer rounds. The package included 4,000 Zuni rockets, to be fired from Ukrainian aircraft, as well as RIM-7 missiles modified to be fired from Ukrainian Buk launchers. Scholz also announced that a German Patriot missile battery would go to Ukraine (a billion dollar package) as well as 40 Marder vehicles. On 17 January 2023 Netherlands Prime Minister Mark Rutte announced he would send a Patriot missile battery to  Ukraine, the third such battery.

Swiss blocks on military exports to Ukraine 
In mid 2022, Switzerland vetoed Denmark's request to send Swiss made Piranha III armoured vehicles to Ukraine. Switzerland requires countries that purchase Swiss arms to request permission to re-export them. Switzerland has also vetoed multiple German requests to donate tank munitions to Ukraine. Poland's, Spain's and other countries' requests have also been vetoed by Switzerland.

Additional military provisions for Ukraine 

On 11 January 2023 Poland announced that it would provide a company of 12 Leopard 2 tanks to Ukraine; on 14 January 2023 the United Kingdom announced that it would give 14 Challenger 2 tanks to Ukraine (compare to the § 4 November 2022 entry in which 90 T-72 tanks were being refurbished by Czech suppliers, with estimated delivery by year-end 2022). Lt. Gen. (Retired) Ben Hodges assessed the contributions up to January 2023 as the equivalent of an armoured brigade. Hodges projects that an armoured division is the goal; the 11 January aid being 26 Czech Dana M2 self-propelled howitzers, 18 US Paladin self-propelled howitzers, 30 UK AS-90 self-propelled guns, several dozen French AMX-10 RC armoured reconnaissance vehicles, 40 German Marder infantry fighting vehicles (IFVs), 50 US Bradley IFVs,  the aforementioned 14 Challenger 2 tanks and 12 Leopard 2 tanks, and the 90 T-72 tanks to augment the tanks which Ukraine already possesses. The eighth meeting of the Ukraine Defense Contact Group gathered at Ramstein, Germany on 18–20 January 2023, where the new German defence minister was introduced to the group. Nine countries have pledged support:
Canada: "200 Canadian APCs to Ukraine"; National Advanced Surface-to-Air Missile System (NASAMS), 39 other armoured support vehicles; various anti-tank weapons, M777 howitzers. (ranked 5th  by materiel volume behind Poland, Germany, the U.K., and the U.S.)
Czech Republic: increase industrial production for large-calibre munitions, howitzers, and armored personnel carriers
Denmark: training for Ukrainian soldiers in the amount of €600 million (euros) 
Estonia: Tens of 155mm FH-70 and 122 mm D-30 howitzers; thousands of 155mm artillery ammunition rounds, with support vehicles; hundreds of Carl-Gustaf M2 anti-tank grenade launchers with ammunition rounds, (€113 million euro value); training for Ukrainian soldiers
Latvia: Tens of MANPADS Stingers; two M-17 helicopters; tens of UAVs;  spare parts for M109 howitzers; training for 2,000 Ukrainian soldiers
Lithuania: Support package worth €125 million euros; two Mi-8 helicopters (€85 million euros); counter-drones, optics, thermo-visual devices, and drones (€40 million); A donation to UK international fund for heavy weaponry (€2 million euros)
Poland: S-60 anti-aircraft guns with 70,000 pieces of ammunition; already donated 42 infantry fighting vehicles; training packages for two mechanized battalions; more 155mm Krab howitzers and various types of ammunition
Slovakia: Increase production of howitzers, de-mining equipment and ammunition; training for Ukrainian soldiers
The UK's largest aid package thus far includes the 14 Challenger 2 tanks, 30 AS-90 self-propelled guns, Bulldog armoured personnel carriers, breachers, bridgelayers, dozens of drones, 100,000 artillery rounds, more Starstreak air defense missiles, more GMLRS ammunition, 600 Brimstone anti-tank munitions, and training for Ukrainian troops to operate this materiel.
US additional contribution as pre-announced 19 January 2023: $2.5 billion more in aid —90 Stryker armored personnel carriers (announced for the first time), 59 more Bradley IFVs (for more than 109 IFVs in January 2023) as well as
 °More rockets for National Advanced Surface-to-Air Missile Systems (NASAMS);   °Eight Avenger air defense systems; °295,000 25mm rounds for Bradley IFVs; °53 MRAPs; °350 Humvees; °20,000 155mm artillery rounds; °600 precision guided munitions; °95,000 105mm artillery rounds; °11,800 120mm mortar rounds; °additional GMLRS (for HIMARS); °12 ammunition support vehicles; °6 command post vehicles; °22 tactical vehicles to tow weapons; °additional High-speed Anti-radiation missiles (HARMs); °2,000 anti-armor rockets; °More than 3 million rounds of small arms ammunition; °Demolition equipment for obstacle clearing; °Claymore mines; °Night vision devices; °Spare parts and other field equipment
Germany: see § Germany's entry in the list of foreign aid to Ukraine during the Russo-Ukrainian War
France: 12 more Caesar truck-mounted artillery guns from Nexter (2 February 2023)

Additional tanks for Ukraine 
Maneuver warfare is an alternative to the January 2022 attrition warfare in the invasion of Ukraine, and battle tanks can prosecute this strategy.
Although Poland, and Finland separately have agreed to send Ukraine 12 Leopard 2 tanks each, Germany must agree to license their transfer. US Secretary Austin has met with Germany's Defence Minister Pistorius on securing Leopard 2 tanks for Ukraine. As of 22 January 2023 Germany will not block the export of Leopard 2 tanks by other contact group nations.

On 20 January 2023 the Netherlands offered F-16s as well as Leopard 2s. The offers are conditional on mutual agreement by multiple nations; Germany will not block the export of Leopard 2s (by Poland, Finland, Denmark, Netherlands) to Ukraine. Poland has requested approval to export Leopard 2s to Ukraine. On 25 January 2023 the US agreed to send tanks to Ukraine under the auspices of the Ukraine Security Assistance Initiative (USAI) in a $400 million package; 31 M1 Abrams tanks (an entire Ukraine tank battalion), and 8 M88 Recovery Vehicles (for rescuing mired tanks) will not arrive in Ukraine for months.  Germany has also agreed to send over a dozen Leopard 2s to Ukraine, and will support the donation with ammunition and training in Germany. Germany has agreed to approve the reexport of Leopard 2s from other nations to Ukraine. The goal is to send 80 Leopard 2s to Ukraine. By 25 January 2023 the list of nations willing to send tanks to Ukraine had grown (France—Leclercs, UK—14 Challenger 2s, US—31 Abrams M1A2, Canada—4 Leopard 2s, Germany— 112 Leopard 2s (eventually 2 battalions (some 88 tanks) plus 14 2A6s immediately), Poland—14 Leopard 2A4s, Finland—14 Leopard 2 A4/A6s, Denmark—6 Leopard 2A5/A7s, Netherlands—18 Leopard 2A6s, Norway—8 Leopard 2A4s, Portugal—4 Leopard 2A6s, and Spain— 20-53 Leopard 2A4s (20 are in good condition, the remainder need repair) respectively). On 23 February Finland announced its contribution will include 3 pieces of Leopard 2 mine clearing tanks built in Leopard 2A4 platform.

On 7 February 2023 the European community determined that industrial manufacturers hold 178 Leopard 1 tanks which could be refurbished and provided to Ukraine, with 20-25 Leopard 1A5 tanks available in the upcoming months of 2023. The remainder could be delivered in 2024, assuming that Germany, the Netherlands, and Denmark fund them.

On 24 February 2023 Poland delivered 4 Leopard 2A4 tanks to Ukraine, 10 more are to arrive by 9 March 2023;  Sweden has announced it intends to donate up to 10 Leopard 2A5 tanks.  When marshaled, the contributions from Poland, Canada, Norway, and Spain suffice to field a battalion of Leopard 2A4s.  Poland is also giving Ukraine 60 PT-91 tanks.

Training in combined arms operations

Battalion-level training in combined arms maneuver for Ukraine is underway. By summer 2023 2,000 Ukrainian soldiers would be trained in France; in Poland 150 additional French instructors would augment training of 600 Ukrainian soldiers per month (up from 280 soldiers per month). Similar training is coming from Canada, Denmark, Estonia, Latvia, Poland, Slovakia, Germany, the UK, and the US. The EU is doubling its training commitment to 30,000 troops. In February 2023 a battalion of Ukrainian troops completed five weeks of unit training in combined arms in Germany. See: Small unit tactics. Training of the experienced Ukrainian tankers could take as little as a third to a half the time needed for conscripted troops, estimates Lt. Gen. (Retired) Ben Hodges. In order to reach the Ready state, maintenance of the donated Leopard 2s is going to take weeks. All told, the troops could be ready by early spring 2023.  

The noncommissioned officer (NCO) is key to Ukrainian military successes against Russia, according to Senior Enlisted Advisor to the Chairman Ramón "CZ" Colón-López; Ukrainian training began using three service-specific NCO training centers after 2014.

As of February 2023 the US is planning a HIMARS training center in Europe. One method could be to train the soldiers to emphasise more maneuver: to shape the battlefield with fires, and to then maneuver, which might lessen the need for as much ammunition and fires.

On 3 February 2023 a presidential drawdown package was announced. The package includes:
Additional ammunition for High Mobility Artillery Rocket Systems;
Additional 155mm artillery rounds;
Additional 120mm mortar rounds;
190 heavy machine guns with thermal imagery sights and associated ammunition to counter unmanned aerial systems;
181 Mine Resistant Ambush Protected vehicles;
250 Javelin anti-armor systems;
2,000 anti-armor rockets;
Claymore anti-personnel munitions;
Demolitions munitions;
Cold weather gear, helmets and other field equipment.
On 31 January 2023 Reuters had previously reported that more than $400 million in materiel was allocated by US presidential drawdown authority (officially announced Friday 3 February 2023), including a new weapon, the §GLSDB available under USAI. 

On 20 February 2023, during an unexpected visit to Kyiv, US President Biden announced a $half-billion aid package for Ukraine, including artillery ammunition, more FGM-148 Javelins, and howitzers.

Ukraine's air and missile defence   
On 2 February 2023, France and Ukraine announced a complete medium-range air defense system (an Aster 30 Block 1NT SAMP/T system)
On 3 February 2023, concurrently with a $400 million drawdown package, additional air and missile defence capability for Ukraine was announced by USAI (Ukraine Security Assistance Initiative) authority; the package authorised up to $1.725 billion in materiel.
Under USAI, the DOD will provide Ukraine with:
Two HAWK air defense firing units;
Anti-aircraft guns and ammunition;
Equipment to integrate Western air defense launchers, missiles and radars with Ukraine's air defense systems;
Equipment to sustain Ukraine's existing air defense capabilities;
Air defense generators;
Counter-unmanned aerial systems;
Four air surveillance radars;
20 counter-mortar radars;
Spare parts for counter-artillery radars;
Puma unmanned aerial systems;
Precision-guided rockets;
Secure communications equipment;
Medical supplies;
Funding for training, maintenance, and sustainment.   By 3 February 2023 US aid to Ukraine since January 2021 exceeded $29.3 billion; since 2014 US aid to Ukraine has exceeded $32 billion. The French industrial aid to Ukraine's air defense is funded by a €200 million line designed by France for this purpose, having drawn half the fund so far.

 A new weapon, the Ground Launched Small Diameter Bomb (GLSDB) was proposed for Ukraine in November 2022. 
GLSDB has a range of 150 km (93 miles) and is funded by USAI. As the $2.17 billion package includes a USAI component, that USAI component is not immediately available. 

Ukraine's air and missile defence, summary— as of 14 February 2023: to help better defend against Russia's missile attacks, Ukraine's air defense capabilities include equipment to integrate Western air defense launchers, missiles and radars with Ukraine's air defense systems; 4 air surveillance radars; 3 Patriot batteries; HAWK air defense launchers; Satellite communications terminals and services; IRIS-T systems from Germany; a medium-range SAMP/T from France; Ukraine's S-300s and MANPADs (including Starstreaks and FIM-92 Stingers); AN/TPQ-36 and AN/TPQ-53 radars already in Ukraine's inventory as Counter-battery radars; NASAMS systems (at least 3, with 6 more coming); AN/TWQ-1 Avengers; 340 heavy machine guns with thermal imagery sights and associated ammunition to shoot down the Shahed drones. 

Canada and seventeen European nations have agreed to share intelligence, surveillance, and reconnaissance (ISR) data which is to be gathered by satellites under the Allied Persistent Surveillance from Space Initiative (APSS). 
A letter of intent for APSS was signed in Brussels on 15 February 2023; APSS begins operations in 2025. The US National Geospatial Intelligence Agency (NGA) and the National Reconnaissance Office (NRO) had urged commercial satellite firms to provide ISR data to Ukraine.

On 24 February 2023 the US Department of Defense announced a USAI package for Ukraine worth $2 billion: additional Unmanned Aerial Systems (UAS), as well as counter-UASs (counter-drones); additional HIMARS ammunition; additional 155mm artillery ammunition; Mine clearing equipment; Secure communications support equipment; and Funding for training, maintenance, and sustainment. This signifies the beginning of a contracting process with the US defense industrial base rather than the previous drawdowns from materiel stocks. The US and multiple European nations are providing §training in combined arms operations for Ukraine, in order to better use the aid being supplied in the future.

On 17 March 2023 the European Defence Agency agreed to sponsor the EU countries, as well as Norway in a cooperative agreement to provide one million 155mm artillery shells to Ukraine. In December 2022 NATO planning for the western flank of the NATO alliance had 8 battlegroup-sized Rapid Reaction Forces stationed in Estonia, Latvia, Lithuania, Poland, Slovakia, Hungary, Romania, and Bulgaria (listed north to south). NATO planners alerted the member nations that up to 300,000 troups could be deployed to the western flank, in a 30-day period.

Fighter jets for Ukraine 
Poland has announced its MiG-29 fighter jets will transfer to Ukraine (one will be retained for a military museum in Poland).  Four MiGs are being transferred immediately; the remainder are being refurbished before their transfer. On 17 March 2023 Slovakia agreed to give Ukraine its MiG-29 fighter jets.

Materiel to Russia from Iran

Amirabad Port in Iran has been identified as a source of materiel, shipped across the Caspian sea northward to the  Port of Astrakhan. The Musa Jalil and the Begey, which are flagged as Russian ships, carried 200 containers of materiel to Russia, in a €140 million cash transaction, from 10 January 2023, arriving in the port of Astrakhan on 2 February 2023.

Foreign military involvement 

Although NATO and the EU have publicly taken a strict policy of "no boots on the ground" in Ukraine, the United States has significantly increased the secret involvement of special operations military and CIA operatives in support of Ukrainian forces since the beginning of the invasion. In addition, Ukraine has actively sought volunteers from other countries. On 1 March, Ukraine temporarily lifted visa requirements for foreign volunteers who wished to join the fight against Russian forces. The move came after Zelenskyy created the International Legion of Territorial Defense of Ukraine and called on volunteers to "join the defence of Ukraine, Europe and the world". The U.S. also assisted Ukraine with military planning, including war-gaming counteroffensive options.

Ted Galen Carpenter wrote in his book Beyond Nato: Staying out of Europe's Wars, NATO's development would lead to war. The world is now paying the cost for the arrogance of the US and NATO. He said, analysts committed to a US foreign policy of realism and restraint had warned that insisting on expanding the most powerful military alliance in history toward another major power will not end well given the Cold War between the United States and Russia. The Guardian reported, Russia points out having dissolved its military alliance under the Warsaw Pact, asks the West to do the same, while many Russians know NATO as a remnant of the Cold War, which is inherently directed against their country. According to Al Jazeera, the United States, as the self-appointed world policeman, is blamed for interfering in the internal affairs of other countries under various pretexts, in and around Russia and China. The report states, critics accuse the United States and NATO of having dual policies against aggression, occupation, and violation of international law, one for allies and the other for others Where Great powers engage other states in proxy wars for their own benefits, regardless of the cost it.

Ukraine's foreign minister Dmytro Kuleba stated that as of 6 March, approximately 20,000 foreign nationals from 52 countries have volunteered to fight. Most of these volunteers joined the newly created International Legion of Territorial Defense of Ukraine. On 9 June, the Donetsk People's Republic sentenced three foreign volunteers to death. Two of them were British citizens and one was a Moroccan national. The foreign prisoners were later released.

On 3 March, Russian Defence Ministry spokesman Igor Konashenkov warned that mercenaries are not entitled to protection under the Geneva Conventions, and captured foreign fighters would not be considered prisoners of war, but prosecuted as criminals. Shortly thereafter, however, on 11 March, Moscow announced that 16,000 volunteers from the Middle East were ready to join other pro-Russian foreign fighters alongside the Donbas separatists. A video uploaded online showed armed Central African paramilitaries preparing to fight in Ukraine with Russian troops.

On 21 October, a White House press release stated that Iranian troops were in Crimea assisting Russia in launching drone attacks against civilians and civilian infrastructure. On 24 November Ukrainian officials said the military had killed ten Iranians and would target any further Iranian military presence in Ukraine.

Foreign sanctions

Western countries and others imposed limited sanctions on Russia when it recognised Donbas as an independent nation. When the attack began, many other countries applied sanctions intended to devastate the Russian economy. The sanctions targeted individuals, banks, businesses, monetary exchanges, bank transfers, exports, and imports. The sanctions cut major Russian banks from SWIFT, the global messaging network for international payments, but left some limited accessibility to ensure the continued ability to pay for gas shipments. Sanctions also included asset freezes on the Russian Central Bank, which holds $630 billion in foreign-exchange reserves, to prevent it from offsetting the impact of sanctions and froze the Nord Stream 2 gas pipeline. By 1 March, total Russian assets frozen by sanctions amounted to $1 trillion.

Kristalina Georgieva, managing director of the International Monetary Fund (IMF), warned that the conflict posed a substantial economic risk both regionally and internationally. The IMF could help other countries affected, she said, in addition to the $2.2 billion loan package for Ukraine. David Malpass, president of the World Bank Group, warned of far-reaching economic and social effects, and reported that the bank was preparing options for significant economic and fiscal support to Ukraine and the region.

Economic sanctions affected Russia from the first day of the invasion, with its stock market falling by up to 39% (RTS Index). The Russian ruble fell to record lows, and Russians rushed to exchange currency. Stock exchanges in Moscow and Saint Petersburg closed until at least 18 March, the longest closure in Russia's history. On 26 February, S&P Global Ratings downgraded the Russian government credit rating to "junk", causing funds that require investment-grade bonds to dump Russian debt, making further borrowing very difficult for Russia. On 11 April, S&P Global placed Russia under "selective default" on its foreign debt for insisting on payments in rubles. Dozens of corporations, including Unilever, McDonald's, Coca-Cola, Starbucks, Hermès, Chanel, and Prada ceased trading in Russia.

Peace talks and stability of international borders were discussed during the week of 9 May within both Sweden and Finland when their parliaments applied to become full members of NATO.

On 24 March, Joe Biden's administration issued an executive order that barred the sale of Russian gold reserves by US citizens; other G7 leaders took similar action. Gold has been one of Russia's major avenues to protect its economy from the impact of the sanctions imposed since the 2014 annexation of Crimea. In April 2022, Russia supplied 45% of EU's natural gas imports, earning $900 million a day. Russia is the world's largest exporter of natural gas, grains, and fertilisers, and among the world's largest suppliers of crude oil, coal, steel and metals, including palladium, platinum, gold, cobalt, nickel, and aluminium.

In May 2022, the European Commission proposed a ban on oil imports from Russia. With European policy-makers deciding to replace Russian fossil fuel imports with other fossil fuels imports and European coal energy production, as well as due to Russia being "a key supplier" of materials used for "clean energy technologies", the reactions to the war may also have an overall negative impact on the climate emissions pathway. Due to the sanctions imposed on Russia, Moscow is now looking to capitalise on alternative trade routes as the country has practically broken all logistic corridors for trade.

The Russia–EU gas dispute flared up in March 2022. On 14 June, Russia's Gazprom announced that it would be slashing gas flow via the Nord Stream 1 pipeline, due to what it claimed to be Siemens' failure to return on time compressor units that had been sent off to Canada for repair. The explanation was challenged by Germany's energy regulator.

On 17 June, President Putin spoke to investors at St. Petersburg International Economic Forum about economic sanctions, saying that "the economic blitzkrieg against Russia had no chance of succeeding from the very beginning". He further claimed that the sanctions would hurt the countries imposing them more than they would hurt Russia, calling the restrictions "mad and thoughtless". He said to the investors: "Invest here. It's safer in your own house. Those who didn't want to listen to this have lost millions abroad".

In response to the Russian invasion of Ukraine, Estonia has removed a remaining Soviet era monument from a square in Narva. After its removal Estonia was subject to "the most extensive cyberattack" since the 2007 cyberattacks on Estonia.

On 25 August 2022, President Zelensky thanked President Biden for the $3 billion USAI security aid package (24 August 2022), as well as the $3 billion World Bank financial aid package for Ukraine. On 2 September, President Biden requested $13.7 billion "for equipment, intelligence support and direct budgetary support" to Ukraine from Congress.

In January 2023, the US imposed sanctions on the Wagner Group, which is owned by Russian Oligarch Yevgeny Prigozhin, having close ties to Vladimir Putin. The expanded sanctions also targeted related companies and individuals, who were involved in the mercenary activities concerning Ukraine. In February 2023, the US urged the UAE and Egypt to push the military leaders of Libya and Sudan to end their association with the Wagner Group. In Libya, the mercenary firm was assisting the UAE-backed military commander Khalifa Haftar. Besides, the UAE was the main funder of Wagner Group in Libya.  The Russian private military firm had been involved in several African and Middle Eastern nations like Sudan, Libya, Mali, Syria, and the Central African Republic, where it deployed thousands of operatives.

Oleg Deripaska warned in March 2023 that Russia could run out of money by 2024; In 2022 Russia ran a $34 billion budget deficit. The Russian National Wealth Fund is funding the war at the rate of $8 to $9 billion per month, which could exhaust its liquid funds by year-end of 2023. This would affect the retirement pension system of Russia.

Foreign condemnation and protest 

 The invasion received widespread international condemnation and protests occurred around the world. On 2 March, the United Nations General Assembly passed UNGA resolution ES-11/1 condemning the invasion and demanding a full withdrawal of Russian forces. The International Court of Justice ordered Russia to suspend military operations, and the Council of Europe expelled Russia. Many countries imposed sanctions on Russia, which have affected the economies of Russia and the world and provided humanitarian and military aid to Ukraine. The International Criminal Court opened an investigation into crimes against humanity in Ukraine since 2013, as well as war crimes in the 2022 invasion.

See also 

 Outline of the Russo-Ukrainian War
 Belarusian involvement in the 2022 Russian invasion of Ukraine
 2022 in Russia
 2022 in Ukraine
 List of interstate wars since 1945
 List of invasions and occupations of Ukraine
 List of ongoing armed conflicts
 List of wars between Russia and Ukraine
 Post-Soviet conflicts

Notes

References

Further reading

External links 

 The UN and the war in Ukraine at the United Nations
 Think Tank reports on the invasion of Ukraine at the Council of the European Union
 Ukraine conflict updates by the Institute for the Study of War
 2022 Russian invasion of Ukraine at Google News

 
Russo-Ukrainian War
Foreign relations of Russia
Foreign relations of Ukraine
2022 in Russia
2022 in Ukraine
2022 in international relations
Articles containing video clips